The Romania Billie Jean King Cup team represents Romania in Billie Jean King Cup tennis competition. It is governed by the Federația Română de Tenis and currently competes in the World Group I, the highest level of the competition.

Current team
Rankings as of 27 January 2020.

History

Romania’s best result is a semi-final appearance in 1973. Romania is also a five-time Fed Cup quarterfinalist, having reached the last eight in 1974, 1978, 1980, 1981 and 2016. 

It spent a total of twelve years in the competition's World Group, from which it was relegated in 1992. Romania spent the next seven years in the Europe/Africa Zonal level. The team reached the World Group II Play-offs in 1999 but failed to secure a promotion to that level.

Romania competed exclusively at the Europe/Africa Zonal level from 2000 through 2013. With four players among the WTA's top 100 at the end of 2013 and 2014, the team achieved back-to-back promotions between 2014 and 2015. 

As a result, Romania competed at the World Group level in 2016, for the first time since 1992, and were relegated to the World Group II for 2017. In 2018, Romania booked its return to the World Group thanks to a 3-1 play-off victory over Switzerland.

Players

2019 team (World Group)
Simona Halep (#3 Singles; #386 Doubles)
Mihaela Buzarnescu (#29 Singles; #27 Doubles)
Irina-Camelia Begu (#75 Singles; #35 Doubles)
Ana Bogdan (#105 Singles; #360 Doubles)
Monica Niculescu (#106 Singles; #51 Doubles)

2018 team (World Group Play-offs)
Irina-Camelia Begu (#38 Singles; #25 Doubles)
Mihaela Buzărnescu (#40 Singles; #65 Doubles)
Sorana Cîrstea (#34 Singles, #153 Doubles)
Simona Halep (#1 Singles, #77 Doubles)

2018 team (World Group II)
Irina-Camelia Begu (#37 Singles; #27 Doubles)
Ana Bogdan (#86 Singles; #564 Doubles)
Sorana Cîrstea (#38 Singles, #150 Doubles)
Raluca Olaru (#45 Doubles)

2017 team (World Group II Play-offs)
Irina-Camelia Begu (#43 Singles; #111 Doubles)
Sorana Cîrstea (#37 Singles, #1101 Doubles)
Simona Halep (#1 Singles; #133 Doubles)
Monica Niculescu (#77 Singles, #23 Doubles)

2017 team (World Group II)
Irina-Camelia Begu (#29 Singles; #125 Doubles)
Sorana Cîrstea (#62 Singles, #1113 Doubles)
Monica Niculescu (#36 Singles, #19 Doubles)
Patricia Maria Țig (#106 Singles, #205 Doubles)

2016 team (World Group Play-offs)
Irina-Camelia Begu (#29 Singles; #168 Doubles)
Alexandra Dulgheru (#279 Singles; #1062 Doubles)
Simona Halep (#4 Singles; #124 Doubles)
Monica Niculescu (#38 Singles; #19 Doubles)

2016 team (World Group)
Simona Halep (#4 Singles; #124 Doubles)
Monica Niculescu (#38 Singles; #19 Doubles)
Andreea Mitu (#210 Singles; #80 Doubles)
Raluca Olaru (#74 Doubles)

2015 team (World Group Play-offs)
Irina-Camelia Begu (#33)
Alexandra Dulgheru (#69)
Andreea Mitu (#76)
Raluca Olaru (#62 Doubles)

2015 team (World Group II)
Simona Halep (#3)
Irina-Camelia Begu (#40)
Monica Niculescu (#46)
Alexandra Dulgheru (#82)
Sorana Cîrstea (#90) INJ
Notes
INJ Player withdrew from the squad due to an injury.

2014 team
Simona Halep 
Sorana Cîrstea
Irina-Camelia Begu
Monica Niculescu

2013 team
Sorana Cîrstea
Andreea Mitu
Raluca Olaru
Cristina Dinu

2012 team
Monica Niculescu
Irina-Camelia Begu
Simona Halep
Mihaela Buzărnescu

2011 team
Sorana Cîrstea
Monica Niculescu
Alexandra Dulgheru
Cristina Dinu

2010 team
Alexandra Dulgheru
Ioana Raluca Olaru
Simona Halep
Irina-Camelia Begu

2009 team
Sorana Cîrstea
Monica Niculescu
Ioana Raluca Olaru
Mihaela Buzărnescu

Results
Only World Group, World Group Play-off, World Group II, and World Group II Play-off ties are included.

1973–1979

1980–1989

1990–1999

2010–2019

References

External links

Billie Jean King Cup teams
Fed Cup
Fed Cup